Sindelsdorf is a municipality  in the Weilheim-Schongau district, in Bavaria, Germany.

People who have worked on the ground 

 Heinrich Campendonk (1889-1957), German-Dutch painter of the Blaue Reiter, in Sindelsdorf from 1911 to 1916
 Franz Marc (1880-1916), German expressionist painter of the Blaue Reiter

See also 

 Fichtsee

References

Weilheim-Schongau